McCabe Building may refer to:

McCabe Building (Victoria, Texas), listed on the National Register of Historic Places (NRHP)
McCabe Building (Everett, Washington), listed on the NRHP in Snohomish County, Washington

See also
McCabe House, NRHP-listed in Charleston, West Virginia